Jacob Aikhionbare (born 21 October 1984) is a Nigerian footballer. He plays for Thai Premier League clubside Thai Port F.C. 
Jacob scored 9 goals from 33 appearances in his first season for Thai Port after joining from NPL team Sunshine Stars F.C.
He came on as a substitute in the 2010 Thai League Cup final and won a winner's medal after Thai Port defeated Buriram PEA F.C. 2-1.

He penned a new 2-year contract in December 2010.

External links
 https://web.archive.org/web/20101202073907/http://thaiportfc.com/first-team/312-14-jacob-aikhionbare.html

1984 births
Living people
Jacob Aikhionbare
Nigerian footballers
Expatriate footballers in Thailand
Association football forwards